Augustin Savard:

 Marie Gabriel Augustin Savard (1814—1881) — French composer
 Marie Emmanuel Augustin Savard (1861—1942) — French composer, his son